Augustus Edwards (born 13 April 1995) is a Liberian American football running back for the Baltimore Ravens of the National Football League (NFL). He played college football at Miami (FL) before transferring to Rutgers and signed with the Ravens as an undrafted free agent in 2018. Edwards' nickname is "Gus Bus"; he is known for his large size and "bruising" running style.

Early life 
Edwards was born in Liberia and moved to the United States at the age of five. He attended and played high school football at Tottenville High School.

Edwards was named as a three-star recruit by ESPN, 247Sports.com, Rivals.com, and Scout.com.

College career
Edwards attended and played college football at the University of Miami from 2013–2016 and for the Rutgers Scarlet Knights in 2017 as a graduate transfer.

Collegiate statistics

Professional career

2018
Edwards signed with the Baltimore Ravens as an undrafted free agent on 4 May 2018. He was waived on 1 September 2018 and was signed to the practice squad the next day. He was promoted to the active roster on 13 October 2018. In Week 6 of the 2018 season, he made his professional debut in the 21–0 victory over the Tennessee Titans. He had 10 carries for 42 yards in the game. In a Week 11 victory over the Cincinnati Bengals, he recorded 17 carries for 115 yards and a touchdown.

Edwards joined elite company on 25 November 2018, when he recorded 23 carries for 118 yards in a 34–17 victory over the Oakland Raiders. He became the first Ravens' rookie running back to have back to back 100+ yard rushing games since Jamal Lewis in the 2000 season. He finished the season as the Ravens leading rusher with 718 rushing yards and two touchdowns. He finished fifth among all rookie running backs in rushing yards. In the Wild Card Round against the Los Angeles Chargers, he had 23 rushing yards in his playoff debut, a 23–17 loss.

2019
In Week 11 against the Houston Texans, Edwards rushed eight times for 112 yards and a touchdown in the 41–7 win.
In Week 17 against the Pittsburgh Steelers, Edwards rushed 21 times for 130 yards during the 28–10 win. In the 2019 season, Edwards finished with 133 carries for 711 rushing yards and two rushing touchdowns.

2020
Edwards signed a one-year exclusive-rights free agent tender with the Ravens on 28 July 2020.

In Week 13 against the Dallas Cowboys, Edwards rushed for 101 yards on seven carries during the 34–17 win. In Week 14, against the Cleveland Browns, he had seven carries for 49 rushing yards and two rushing touchdowns in the 47–42 victory. In the 2020 season, Edwards played in all 16 games, of which he started six. He finished with 144 carries for 723 rushing yards and six rushing touchdowns to go along with nine receptions for 129 receiving yards.

2021
The Ravens placed a second-round restricted free agent tender on Edwards on 10 March 2021. He signed a two-year contract extension with the team worth $10 million on 7 June. On 9 September 2021, Edwards suffered a torn ACL during practice ending his season. He was put on injured reserve the following day.

2022
Edwards was placed on the reserve/PUP list to start the season on 23 August 2022. He was activated on 22 October. In his first game back, he scored two rushing touchdowns against the Cleveland Browns in the 23–20 victory in Week 7. In the 2022 regular season, Edwards played in nine games and started four. He finished with 87 carries for 433 rushing yards and three rushing touchdowns.

NFL career statistics

References

External links

Yes, his first name is Augustus
Baltimore Ravens bio
Rutgers Scarlet Knights bio
Miami Hurricanes bio

1995 births
Living people
Sportspeople from Staten Island
Players of American football from New York City
American football running backs
Miami Hurricanes football players
Rutgers Scarlet Knights football players
Baltimore Ravens players
Liberian players of American football
Liberian emigrants to the United States